Cryptids is an upcoming anthology horror film produced by Justin M. Seaman, Zane Hershberger, and P. J. Starks. It stars Joe Bob Briggs as a talk radio host who decides to discuss the topic of cryptozoology, prompting listeners to call in and relay stories about cryptids. The film includes segments directed by Brett DeJager, Zane Hershberger, Max Groah, John William Holt, Robert Kuhn, Billy Pon, and Justin M. Seaman.

Premise

Cast
The cast includes:

Production
Director and producer Justin M. Seaman met Joe Bob Briggs at Scarefest 2018 in Lexington, Kentucky, leading Briggs to be cast in the role of Major Harlan Dean.

Funding for Cryptids began in 2013. Seaman planned to launch a crowdfunding campaign on Indiegogo to help finance the film in March 2020, but postponed it due to the outbreak of the COVID-19 pandemic, noting that "we decided it wasn't the best time to be asking for funds." The Indiegogo campaign was eventually launched in July 2020.

In January 2022, producer P. J. Starks stated that, according to co-producer Zane Hershberger, "they're finishing up the editing process on a couple of the segments. He's aiming to release the movie in summer of 2022."

See also
 Impact of the COVID-19 pandemic on cinema

References

External links
 

Upcoming English-language films
American horror anthology films
Films about cryptids
Upcoming films
Crowdfunded films
Film productions suspended due to the COVID-19 pandemic